The 2010 Premier League Season was the second division of British speedway. The regular season league was won by the Edinburgh Monarchs but Newcastle Diamonds won the playoffs. The first fixtures of the season took place on 5 April, and the season ended on 31 October 2010. The King's Lynn Stars were the defending champions from 2009. The Newcastle Diamonds won most of the other awards.

Season overview
The 2010 Premier League campaign was a successful campaign for both the Edinburgh Monarchs and Newcastle Diamonds. The Monarchs finished the season as Premier League Champions, having amassed 74 points, 16 points clear of the nearest rival (The Diamonds). 

Although the Monarchs dominated the League, it was the Diamonds that took the most silverware of the season by winning the Premier League playoffs (against Sheffield Tigers), the Premier Trophy (against Birmingham Brummies), and the Premier League Knockout Cup (against Edinburgh Monarchs). For the other competitions, the Sheffield Tigers were victorious in the Premier League Pairs, with Ricky Ashworth and Josh Auty taking the crown ahead of the Brummies pair. However, the Brummies were victorious in the Premier League Fours, with them dominating the event throughout. The Dane Kenni Larsen then finished off a remarkable season for the Diamonds by being crowned PLRC champion and only narrowingly missing out on the Highest CMA for the season, with the Monarchs' American Ryan Fisher achieving 9.69 average for the season.

Fixtures and results

Last updated: December 10, 2010. Source: BSPA

Colours: Blue = home win; Red = away win; White = draw

Home team listed in the left-hand column

League table

Home: 3W = Home win by 7 points or more; 2W = Home win by between 1 and 6 points
Away: 4W = Away win by 7 points or more; 3W = Away win by between 1 and 6 points; 1L = Away loss by 6 points or less
M = Meetings; D = Draws; L = Losses; F = Race points for; A = Race points against; +/- = Race points difference; Pts = Total Points

Last updated: October 20, 2010

Source: BSPA

Premier League playoffs

Semifinals

First leg

Second leg

Final

First leg

Second leg

Promotion/relegation playoff
The promotion/relegation playoff was contested between the Newcastle Diamonds and the bottom Elite League team, Ipswich Witches. The Diamonds narrowly lost the first leg, by 44-46, despite leading at one point by 34-26 and missing regular riders Jason King, Mark Lemon and in-form reserve Dakota North. The Diamonds were heavily defeated at Ipswich by 64-32, leading to an aggregate defeat of 110-76.

First leg

Second leg

Premier Trophy

Premier League Knockout Cup

Premier League Riders Championship

Final leading averages

Riders & final averages
Berwick

Adrian Rymel 8.66 
Marcin Rempała 8.57
Michal Makovský 7.24
Lee Complin 7.17
Michał Rajkowski 6.55
Paul Clews 6.46
Craig Branney 5.62
Jade Mudgway 4.69
Anders Andersen 3.32

Birmingham

Jason Lyons 9.58
Chris Kerr 8.51
Steve Johnston 8.49 
Richard Sweetman 8.37 
Aaron Summers 7.76 
Justin Sedgmen 7.40 
Klaus Jakobsen 5.04
Kyle Newman 4.79
Jake Anderson 2.63

Edinburgh

Ryan Fisher 10.01
Kevin Wolbert 8.53
Matthew Wethers 8.18
Kalle Katajisto 7.86 
Andrew Tully 7.78 
William Lawson 5.66
Tobias Busch 4.88
József Tabaka 4.46
Max Dilger 2.93
Arlo Bugeja 2.36
Ashley Morris 2.36
Cal McDade 2.09

Glasgow

Joe Screen 9.49 
Travis McGowan 9.33
James Grieves 7.94
Josh Grajczonek 7.57
Nick Morris 5.47
John Branney 5.14
Lee Dicken 4.42
Jamie Courtney 3.16
Jake Anderson 2.98
Mitchell Davey 2.69

King's Lynn

Kevin Doolan 9.76 
Oliver Allen 8.72 
Tomáš Topinka 8.21
Joe Haines 7.32
Linus Eklöf 7.29
Kozza Smith 6.92
Lasse Bjerre 6.71
Chris Mills 5.97
Casper Wortmann 5.47
Adam Roynon 5.24
Darren Mallett 4.85
Cal McDade 2.45

Newcastle

Kenni Larsen 10.00 
René Bach 9.42
Mark Lemon 9.38 
Jason King 6.72
Derek Sneddon 5.67
Dakota North 5.40
Adam McKinna 3.29
Anders Andersen 2.54

Newport

Leigh Lanham 8.30
Kyle Legault 7.92
Kim Nilsson 7.45
Craig Watson 7.14
Robin Aspegren 6.25
Anders Mellgren 5.35
Alex Davies 5.30
Todd Kurtz 4.88

Redcar

Gary Havelock 8.32
Emiliano Sanchez 7.12
Ben Wilson 6.56
James Grieves 6.27
Maks Gregorič 5.45
Peter Juul 5.45
Tomáš Suchánek 5.19
Stuart Swales 5.04
Henning Bager 4.69
Jan Graversen 4.50
Charles Wright 4.39

Rye House

Linus Sundström 9.84 
Jordan Frampton 8.26
Chris Neath 7.68
Stefan Ekberg 6.95
Luke Bowen 6.05
Kyle Hughes 5.60
Kurt Shields 4.00
Robbie Kessler 3.40
Lee Strudwick 2.38
Paul Starke 2.27

Scunthorpe

David Howe 8.38
Magnus Karlsson 8.06
Carl Wilkinson 7.57
Tero Aarnio 6.91
Joel Parsons 6.91
Viktor Bergström 5.57
Jerran Hart 5.17
Jan Graversen 4.63
Simon Lambert 4.04

Sheffield

Ricky Ashworth 8.28 
Josh Auty 8.23
Richard Hall 7.32
Josef Franc 7.29
Hugh Skidmore 6.36
Paul Cooper 5.90
Simon Lambert 5.16
Arlo Bugeja 3.35

Somerset

Shane Parker 8.40 
Cory Gathercole 7.75 
Sam Masters 7.17
Ritchie Hawkins 6.50
Christian Hefenbrock 6.00
James Holder 5.15
Luboš Tomíček Jr. 4.65
Mark Baseby 2.52
Kyle Howarth 1.94

Stoke

Claus Vissing 7.39
Lee Smart 6.66
Taylor Poole 6.45
Hynek Štichauer 6.45
Luboš Tomíček Jr. 6.02
Ricky Wells 5.98
Klaus Jakobsen 5.73
Ben Wilson 5.48
Jan Graversen 5.45
James Holder 3.73
Michal Rajkowski 3.33
Jeremia Thelaus 1.78

Workington

Rusty Harrison 7.69
Chris Schramm 7.54
Craig Cook 7.47
Peter Kildemand 7.27
Andre Compton 6.97
Richard Lawson 6.63
John Branney 6.05
Kenny Ingalls 5.81
Casper Wortmann 5.75

See also
List of United Kingdom Speedway League Champions
Knockout Cup (speedway)

References

Speedway Premier League
Premier League
Speedway Premier